Stefan Binder (born 12 October 1978) is a German former professional footballer who played as a defender.

Career
Binder was born in Waldkirchen. He started his senior career at the SV Hutthurm but left soon for SV Wacker Burghausen. In the 2002–03 season, he moved to SSV Jahn Regensburg where he stayed during the promotion to the 2. Bundesliga in 2003–04 and the relegation to Regionalliga Süd the following season. When SSV Jahn Regensburg was relegated again to the Bayernliga in the 2005–06 season, he left for Sportfreunde Siegen but returned in 2007.

In Regensburg he acquired the nickname "Bimbo" in reference to Franz Binder.

References

External links 
 
 

1978 births
Living people
People from Freyung-Grafenau
Sportspeople from Lower Bavaria
German footballers
Association football defenders
2. Bundesliga players
3. Liga players
TSV 1860 Munich players
SV Wacker Burghausen players
SSV Jahn Regensburg players
Sportfreunde Siegen players
Footballers from Bavaria